Joseph Browne may refer to:

Joseph Browne (civil servant) (born 1948), Fijian civil servant
Joseph Browne (politician) (1876–1946), Australian politician and judge
Joseph Browne (provost) (1700–1767), English clergyman and academic, Provost of The Queen's College, Oxford
Joseph Browne (physician) ( 1706), English physician, charlatan and hack writer
Joe Browne, executive of the National Football League
Joey Browne or Ian Browne (born 1931), Australian former track cyclist

See also
Joseph Brown (disambiguation)
William Joseph Browne (1897–1989), Canadian politician